State elections were held in South Australia on 27 March 1915. All 46 seats in the South Australian House of Assembly were up for election. The incumbent Liberal Union government led by Premier of South Australia Archibald Peake was defeated by the opposition United Labor Party led by Leader of the Opposition Crawford Vaughan. Each district elected multiple members, with voters casting multiple votes.

A redistribution in 1913 was forced by the enlargement of the House of Assembly to 46 members. The state was divided into 19 electoral districts: eight 3-member, eleven 2-member. The redistribution's intention failed as it was meant to assist the Liberal Union.

The United Labor Party became the South Australian branch of the Australian Labor Party (ALP) on 14 September 1917.

The National Labor Party, a splinter group of the ALP, formed in 1917 state and federally over the issue of conscription. The ALP had elected 26 of 46 Assembly members at the 1915 election, all but seven ALP MPs defected to National Labor. The ALP had 7 of 20 Council members, four defected. Seven MPs of the renamed National Party were re-elected at the 1918 election.

See also
 Members of the South Australian House of Assembly, 1915-1918
 Members of the South Australian Legislative Council, 1915-1918

Notes

References
History of South Australian elections 1857-2006, volume 1: ECSA
State and federal election results in Australia since 1890

Elections in South Australia
1915 elections in Australia
1910s in South Australia
March 1915 events